Club Deportivo Universidad Católica is a Chilean professional association football club based in Santiago. In international competitions, have won a 1 trophies; Copa Interamericana (1994). In 1993, Universidad Católica was the runner-up in the most important international tournament in South America: the Copa Libertadores de América, losing in the finals against the biggest club in Brazil and defending Libertadores' Champion São Paulo. Universidad Católica has reached semi-finals in the Copa Libertadores four times (years 1962, 1966, 1969 and 1984).

Records 

 Most appearances in Copa Libertadores de América: Mario Lepe, 76
 Most appearances in Copa Sudamericana: Cristopher Toselli, 27
 Most goals in South America competition: Alberto Acosta, 19
 Biggest win: Universidad Católica 6–0 Mineros de Guayana, in the Copa Libertadores, 25 February 1997 and Universidad Católica 6–0 Minervén S.C., in the Copa Libertadores, 4 March 1997
 Biggest defeat: Universidad Católica 2–7 Emelec, in the Copa Libertadores 22 February 1962)

By season 
Key

Pld = Played
W = Games won
D = Games drawn
L = Games lost
GF = Goals for
GA = Goals against
GD = Goal difference
Grp = Group stage

R1 = First round
R2 = Second round
R3 = Third round
R4 = Fourth round
R16 = Round of 16
R32 = Round of 32
QF = Quarter-final
SF = Semi-final

Key to colours:

By competition

Matches

Notes

References

External links 

 

international football